Daria Vladimirovna Strokous (born 25 September 1990) is a Russian fashion model, film actress, and photographer.

Early life 
Strokous was born in Moscow, Russia (then still part of the Soviet Union) to Vladimir and Olga Strokous. Soon after she was born, her family moved to Benin where she lived and studied until the age of five.

Modeling career 
In September 2007 she debuted in Fashion Weeks in Milan and Paris. Her debut was an exclusive for the Prada show in Milan. V magazine included her in their Top 10 Models of 2008. The magazine New York named her as one of Top 10 Models to watch, as well as Today's Top Model in Milan.

Strokous has also been featured in Style.com for many top designers and Models.com in featured articles.

Strokous took part in a project of a new online magazine Nomenus Quarterly. This was a project for a new collection of the brand THE ROW.

She played a small role in the 2011 film Contagion. She also appeared as the lead model in the short film for Dior " Secret Garden – Versailles" by Inez van Lamsweerde and Vinoodh Matadin.

In 2014, Strokous was included in the New Generation of "Industry Icons" list by Models.com.

Education 
Strokous is currently a student at University of Southern California's School of Cinematic Arts.

Filmography

Film

References

External links 

The Internet Fashion Database

1990 births
Living people
Russian female models
Russian film actresses
Actresses from Moscow
21st-century Russian actresses
Russian emigrants to Benin
Russian people of Ukrainian descent
Women Management models